Thanh Nhan Hospital (Bệnh viện Thanh Nhàn in Vietnamese) is a large hospital in Thanh Nhan ward, Hai Ba Trung district, Hanoi, Vietnam. Located in a labour quarter, it is regarded as a hospital for workers and the poor in Hanoi. It was recently updated, creating two more adjunct hospitals.

References

Hospitals in Hanoi
Hospitals with year of establishment missing